Sant Jaume de Frontanyà is a municipality in the comarca of the Berguedà in Catalonia, Spain. It is situated in the Pyrenees below the peak of Pedró de Tubau (1543 m). The village was the smallest municipality in Catalonia in terms of population but in 2018 lost the title to Gisclareny after the village grew. The monumental Romanesque church of Sant Jaume is a protected historic-artistic monument from the 11th century. The village is served by a local road to Borredà and it is well known for its peace and tranquility.

History
The town was first documented in 905, at the consecration of the Church of Sant Jaume Vell.

The guesthouse and restaurant Fonda Cal Marxandó has been welcoming visitors since 1851. Today, it is known for its traditional Catalan cuisine, made with locally sourced ingredients.

In December 2009 it was the second town in Catalonia to hold a Catalan independence referendum, voting overwhelmingly in favour.

The book Sant Jaume de Frontanyà: Natura, Art i Pau ("Nature, Art and Peace") was published in 2005, written by experts from the area.

Places of interest 
 Monastery of Sant Jaume de Frontanyà. 11th century
 Hermitage of Sant Esteve de Tubau. Pre-Romanesque origin.
 Shrine of Our Lady of Oms. 18th century
 Restaurant Fonda Cal Marxandó. Documented since 1851.

Demography

References

 Panareda Clopés, Josep Maria; Rios Calvet, Jaume; Rabella Vives, Josep Maria (1989). Guia de Catalunya, Barcelona: Caixa de Catalunya.  (Spanish).  (Catalan). 'Sant Jaume de Frontanya: Natura, Art i pau' (2005).

External links
Official website 
 Government data pages 

Municipalities in Berguedà